This page lists all described species of the spider family Synaphridae accepted by the World Spider Catalog :

Africepheia

Africepheia Miller, 2007
 A. madagascariensis Miller, 2007 (type) — Madagascar

Cepheia

Cepheia Simon, 1894
 C. longiseta (Simon, 1881) (type) — Southern Europe

† Iardinidis

† Iardinidis Wunderlich, 2004
 † I. brevipes Wunderlich, 2004

Synaphris

Synaphris Simon, 1894
 S. agaetensis Wunderlich, 1987 — Canary Is.
 S. calerensis Wunderlich, 1987 — Canary Is.
 S. dalmatensis Wunderlich, 1980 — Croatia
 S. franzi Wunderlich, 1987 — Canary Is.
 S. lehtineni Marusik, Gnelitsa & Kovblyuk, 2005 — Romania, Bulgaria, Ukraine
 S. letourneuxi (Simon, 1884) (type) — Egypt
 S. orientalis Marusik & Lehtinen, 2003 — Turkmenistan, Iran?
 S. saphrynis Lopardo, Hormiga & Melic, 2007 — Spain, Savage Is.?
 S. schlingeri Miller, 2007 — Madagascar
 S. toliara Miller, 2007 — Madagascar
 S. wunderlichi Marusik & Zonstein, 2011 — Israel

References

Synaphridae